Belleplain State Forest is a  New Jersey State Forest in northern Cape May County and eastern Cumberland County. It has many young pine, oak and Atlantic white cedar trees, having better soil than the northern Pine Barrens. It was established in 1928 and the Civilian Conservation Corps (CCC) set up camps in 1933, and converted Meisle Cranberry Bog into Lake Nummy, and constructed the original forest headquarters, maintenance building, a road system, bridges, and dams.

A fee is charged for camping and picnicking.

On June 7, 2002, the Green Acres Program added  of privately owned land to Belleplain.

Former Lynyrd Skynyrd Guitarist Ed King resided on a Property within the Forest.

See also

 List of New Jersey state parks

References

External links
 Green Acres Program
 NY-NJTC: Belleplain State Forest Trail Details and Info

New Jersey state forests
Protected areas of Cape May County, New Jersey
Protected areas of Cumberland County, New Jersey
Civilian Conservation Corps in New Jersey
Civilian Conservation Corps camps